Pettus High School is a public high school situated in Pettus, Texas (USA) and is classified as a 2A school by the UIL. Known locally as Pettus Secondary School, it is part of the Pettus Independent School District located in northern Bee County and southern Karnes County. In 2015, the school was rated "Met Standard" by the Texas Education Agency.

Athletics
The Pettus Eagles compete in these sports - 

Baseball
Basketball
Cross Country
Football
Golf
Powerlifting
Softball
Track and Field
Volleyball

References

External links
Pettus ISD

Schools in Bee County, Texas
Public high schools in Texas
Public middle schools in Texas